Evolver is The Choirboys sixth studio CD.  It was released 8 years after their last studio effort Yo-Yo

All 10 tracks on the album are written by Gable and Hulme in a writing partnership that has spanned over two decades.

Track listing
"Fuel (A Day in the Life)" – 3:29
"Pharaohs (Let It Be)" – 3:52
"The Dog Song" – 3:27
"Dream On (All You Need Is Love)"
"Please Believe Me (Come Together)" – 3:56
"Cold Outside Your Heart (Good Day Sunshine)" – 3:41
"Break It Free (Girl)" – 3:26
"Ride Up (Baby's in Black)" – 3:34
"Roll It Over (Yesterday)" – 3:20
"All Over You (She's Leaving Home)" – 4:25

2004 albums
The Choirboys (band) albums